UFC 131: dos Santos vs. Carwin was a mixed martial arts event held by the Ultimate Fighting Championship on 11 June 2011 at the Rogers Arena in Vancouver, British Columbia, Canada.

Background

Brock Lesnar was originally scheduled to face Junior dos Santos after their coaching stint on The Ultimate Fighter 13, but due to a recurring illness, Lesnar was replaced by Shane Carwin. Originally, a matchup between Carwin, and Jon Olav Einemo was scheduled for this event. Einemo remained on the card and faced Dave Herman, who was pulled from a matchup with Joey Beltran as a result. Beltran was matched up with Aaron Rosa.

Court McGee was scheduled to fight Jesse Bongfeldt, but was forced to pull out due to a torn MCL while training and was replaced by Chris Weidman

Rani Yahya was scheduled face Dustin Poirier at this event, but withdrew due to injury on 3 May 2011 and was replaced by UFC newcomer Jason Young.

Anthony Perosh was expected to face Krzysztof Soszynski at this event, but Perosh was forced from the bout with an injury and replaced by Igor Pokrajac.  However, Pokrajac was forced to pull out of the bout due to injuries just days before the event and was replaced by Mike Massenzio. The Soszynski/Pokrajac bout was later rescheduled for UFC 140, where Pokrajac won by knockout.

On 17 May a torn muscle forced Mac Danzig out of his bout with Donald Cerrone.  Promotional newcomer Vagner Rocha replaced Danzig.

UFC newcomer Dave Herman was originally slated to face Rob Broughton at this event, but Broughton was later replaced by Joey Beltran, who was later replaced with John Olav Einemo since Carwin replaced an injured Lesnar.

UFC 131 featured two preliminary fights live on Spike TV, and the remainder of the preliminary bouts streamed on Facebook and YouTube.

Results

Bonus awards
Fighters were awarded $70,000 bonuses.

 Fight of the Night: Dave Herman vs. Jon Olav Einemo
 Knockout of the Night: Sam Stout
 Submission of the Night: Chris Weidman

Reported Payout
The following is the reported payout to the fighters as reported to the Vancouver Athletic Commission. It does not include sponsor money or "locker room" bonuses often given by the UFC and also do not include the UFC's traditional "fight night" bonuses.

Junior dos Santos: $200,000 ($100,000 win bonus) def. Shane Carwin: $40,000
Kenny Florian: $130,000 ($65,000 win bonus) def. Diego Nunes: $12,000
Mark Muñoz: $60,000 ($30,000 win bonus) def. Demian Maia: $43,000
Dave Herman: $36,000 ($18,000 win bonus) def. Jon Olav Einemo: $15,000
Donald Cerrone: $40,000 ($20,000 win bonus) def. Wagner Rocha: $6,000
Sam Stout: $38,000 ($19,000 win bonus) def. Yves Edwards: $12,000
Chris Weidman: $20,000 ($10,000 win bonus) def. Jesse Bongfeldt: $6,000
Krzysztof Soszynski: $24,000 ($12,000 win bonus) def. Mike Massenzio: $8,000
Nick Ring: $16,000 ($8,000 win bonus) def. James Head: $6,000
Dustin Poirier: $10,000 ($5,000 win bonus) def. Jason Young: $6,000
Joey Beltran: $24,000 ($12,000 win bonus) def. Aaron Rosa: $6,000
Darren Elkins: $16,000 ($8,000 win bonus) def. Michihiro Omigawa: $8,000 ^

^Although not reflected in the Vancouver Athletic Commission paperwork, both Elkins and Omigawa received win bonuses

References

External links
UFC 131 information

Ultimate Fighting Championship events
2011 in mixed martial arts
Mixed martial arts in Canada
Sports competitions in Vancouver
2011 in Canadian sports
Events in Vancouver